James Beckford may refer to:

 James Beckford (athlete) (born 1975), Jamaican long jumper
 James A. Beckford (1942–2022), British sociologist of religion